The Empire of Japan competed at the 1932 Summer Olympics in Los Angeles, California. 131 athletes competed in 10 sports and also participated in art competitions.

Swimming became the most successful sport after collecting five gold medals, five silver medals and also two bronze medals. Takeichi Nishi also performed stunningly in equestrian and won Japan's first gold medal in the sport. The field hockey team also competed with two other teams from the United States and India, and won a silver medal.

With so many teams, Japan's delegation was the second largest, exceeded only by  the United States.

Medalists

| width=78% align=left valign=top |

| width=22% align=left valign=top |

Athletics

Aquatics

Swimming

Diving

 Men's 3 metre springboard
Kazuo Kobayashi - 133.76(6th Place)
Tetsutaro Namae - 125.18(8th Place)
 Men's 10 metre platform
 Hidekatsu Ishida - 75.92(8th Place)

 Women's 3 metre springboard
 Etsuko Kamakura - 60.78(7th Place)
 Women's 10 metre platform
 Etsuko Kamakura - 31.36(6th Place)

Water polo

7 August

8 August

12 August

Final standings

Boxing

Equestrian

Field hockey

Standings

Matches

Gymnastics

Rowing

Men

Wrestling

Art competitions

References

Official Olympic Reports
International Olympic Committee results database

Nations at the 1932 Summer Olympics
1932
Summer Olympics